(English: Men's Second Division) or D2 is the third-tier basketball competition among clubs in Iceland. It is organized by the Icelandic Basketball Federation.
It consists of 11 teams and the season consists of a home-and-away schedule of 20 games. The top four non-reserve teams meet in a playoff for the victory in the league and promotion to 1. deild karla.

History
On 13 March 2020, the 2019–20 season was postponed due to the coronavirus outbreak in Iceland. The day after, the Icelandic Basketball Federation canceled the rest of the season.

2022-23 teams

Source

Champions

Notes

Titles per club

Notes

References

External links
 KKÍ
2. deild karla – kki.is

1973 establishments in Iceland
3
Ice
Sports leagues established in 1973
Professional sports leagues in Iceland